The 2012 Chivas USA season was the club's eighth year of existence. It was the club's eighth consecutive season in Major League Soccer, the top division in American soccer. Chivas USA competed in Major League Soccer's Western Conference.

Overview

Allocation ranking 
Chivas USA is in the #5 position in the MLS Allocation Ranking. The allocation ranking is the mechanism used to determine which MLS club has first priority to acquire a U.S. National Team player who signs with MLS after playing abroad, or a former MLS player who returns to the league after having gone to a club abroad for a transfer fee. A ranking can be traded, provided that part of the compensation received in return is another club's ranking.

International roster spots 
Chivas USA has 9 MLS International Roster Slots for use in the 2012 season. Each club in Major League Soccer is allocated 8 international roster spots and Chivas USA acquired a permanent additional spot from Real Salt Lake in 2004.

Future draft pick trades 
Future picks acquired: None.
Future picks traded: *2013 MLS SuperDraft Round 2 pick to New England Revolution.

Transfers

In

Trial

Out

Roster

Management

Kits

Official sponsors
Corona
Adidas
Home Depot
General Mills
Volaris
Source:

Friendlies

Competitions

MLS

League table

Results summary

Results by round

Results

U.S. Open Cup

Squad statistics

Appearances and goals

|-
|colspan="14"|Players away from Chivas USA on loan:
|-
|colspan="14"|Players who left Chivas USA during the season:

|}

Goal scorers

Goalkeeper stats
{| border="1" cellpadding="4" cellspacing="0" style="margin: 1em 1em 1em 1em 0; background: #f9f9f9; border: 1px #aaa solid; border-collapse: collapse; font-size: 95%; text-align: center;"
|-
| rowspan="2" style="width:1%; text-align:center;"|No.
| rowspan="2" style="width:1%; text-align:center;"|Nat.
| rowspan="2" style="width:44%; text-align:center;"|Player
| colspan="3" style="text-align:center;"|Total
| colspan="3" style="text-align:center;"|Major League Soccer
| colspan="3" style="text-align:center;"|U.S. Open Cup
|-
|MIN
|GA
|GAA
|MIN
|GA
|GAA
|MIN
|GA
|GAA
|-
| style="text-align: right;" |1
|
| style="text-align: left;" |Dan Kennedy
|2970
|58
|1.75
|2880
|54
|1.6875
|90
|4
|4.00
|-
| style="text-align: right;" |28
|
| style="text-align: left;" |Tim Melia
|450
|6
|1.2
|180
|4
|2.00
|270
|2
|0.50
|-
| style="text-align: right;" |24
|
| style="text-align: left;" |Patrick McLain
|0
|0
|0.00
|0
|0
|0.00
|0
|0
|0.00
|-
|colspan="3"| TOTALS
|3420
|64
|1.68
|3060
|58
|1.70
|360
|6
|1.50

Disciplinary record

Awards 

MLS All-Star

MLS Player of the Week

MLS Team of the Week

Reserves

MLS Reserves League – Western Conference

Match results

References 

Chivas USA
Chivas USA seasons
Chivas USA